The Metadata Working Group was formed in 2006 by Adobe Systems, Apple, Canon, Microsoft and Nokia. Sony joined later in 2008.

The focus of the group is to advance the interoperability of metadata stored in digital media. Its specification, Guidelines for Handling Image Metadata, defined the interoperability among Exif, IIM (old IPTC), and XMP with consumer digital images. The following properties were selected for interoperability:
 keywords
 description
 date and time
 orientation
 rating
 copyright
 creator
 location created
 location shown

Test files for verification were added in 2008 and are available for download.

External links 
 

Metadata
Metadata standards
Information technology organizations
Standards organizations in the United States
International organizations based in the United States
Organizations established in 2006